Charles Dickens Clark (October 7, 1847 – March 15, 1908) was a United States district judge of the United States District Court for the Eastern District of Tennessee and the United States District Court for the Middle District of Tennessee.

Education and career

Born in Laurel Cove, an unincorporated community in Van Buren County, Tennessee, Clark received a Bachelor of Arts degree from Burritt College in 1871 and a Bachelor of Laws from Cumberland School of Law (then part of Cumberland University, now part of Samford University) in 1873. He was on the staff of Confederate States General George G. Dibrell in Richmond, Virginia from 1864 to 1865. He was in private practice in Manchester, Tennessee from 1876 to 1883, and in Chattanooga, Tennessee from 1883 to 1895.

Federal judicial service

Clark was nominated by President Grover Cleveland on December 17, 1894, to a joint seat on the United States District Court for the Eastern District of Tennessee and the United States District Court for the Middle District of Tennessee vacated by Judge David M. Key. He was confirmed by the United States Senate on January 21, 1895, and received his commission the same day. His service terminated on March 15, 1908, due to his death in Chattanooga.

References

Sources
 

1847 births
1908 deaths
Judges of the United States District Court for the Middle District of Tennessee
Judges of the United States District Court for the Eastern District of Tennessee
United States federal judges appointed by Grover Cleveland
19th-century American judges
People from Van Buren County, Tennessee
People from Manchester, Tennessee
People from Chattanooga, Tennessee
Burritt College alumni